The 1938 All-Ireland Minor Football Championship was the 10th staging of the All-Ireland Minor Football Championship, the Gaelic Athletic Association's premier inter-county Gaelic football tournament for boys under the age of 18.

Cavan entered the championship as defending champions.

On 25 September 1938, Cavan won the championship following a 3-3 to 0-8 defeat of Kerry in the All-Ireland final. This was their second All-Ireland title overall and their second in succession.

Results

Connacht Minor Football Championship

Leinster Minor Football Championship

Munster Minor Football Championship

Ulster Minor Football Championship

All-Ireland Minor Football Championship

Semi-Finals

Final

References

1938
All-Ireland Minor Football Championship